Te Waka a Māui (the canoe or vessel of Māui) is a Māori name for the South Island of New Zealand. Some Māori mythology says that it was the vessel which Māui (a demi-god hero, who possessed magic powers) stood on as he hauled up Te Ika-a-Māui (the fish of Māui – the North Island). There are also stories about other people, Kupe and Toi, who discovered Aotearoa (New Zealand).

Māui lived in the Māori ancestral homeland of Hawaiki. One day he hid in the bottom of his brothers' canoe as they went on a long fishing voyage. Māui used his magical powers to increase the distance back to shore so when he was discovered his brothers would not take him back home.  When they were far out into the ocean, Māui dropped his magic fishhook over the side of the canoe. He felt a strong tug on the line, too strong to be a normal type of fish. Māui called on his brothers to help. After quite a struggle they pulled up the North Island of New Zealand – which, since that day, has been known to Māori as Te Ika-a-Maui.  Since then, the South Island of New Zealand has been known as Te Waka a Maui (the canoe of Māui).

The third (smaller) island lying to the south of New Zealand is known as Te Punga a Māui (Māui's anchor), as it was the anchor for Māui's canoe. In English it is known as Stewart Island / Rakiura.

The official names are the South Island or Te Waipounamu. Another old South Island name for the island, following a different tradition from the one above, is Te Waka a Aoraki, the canoe of Aoraki.

References

External links
 "Māori legends and myths - The Legend of Maui and the magic fishhook", New Zealand in History
 "The Legends of Maui and the magic fishhook", Maori-in-Oz

Geography of New Zealand
Māori words and phrases
Māori mythology